Lemmini is a tribe of lemmings in the subfamily Arvicolinae. Species in this tribe are:

Tribe Lemmini

 Genus Lemmus - true lemmings
 Amur lemming (L. amurensis)
 Norway lemming (L. lemmus)
 Beringian lemming (L. nigripes)
 East Siberian lemming (L. paulus)
 West Siberian lemming (L. sibiricus)
 North American brown lemming (L. trimucronatus)
 Genus Myopus - wood lemming
 Wood lemming (M. schisticolor)
 Genus Synaptomys - bog lemmings
 Northern bog lemming (S. borealis)
 Southern bog lemming (S. cooperi)
The fossil taxa Mictomys, Tobienia (both thought to be allied with Synaptomys), and Plioctomys (thought to be allied with Lemmus and Myopus) are also thought to belong to this group.

A 2021 phylogenetic study using mtDNA recovered Lemmini as being the most basal clade of the Arvicolinae, diverging during the late Miocene, about 8 million years ago.

References 

Voles and lemmings
Mammal tribes
Taxa named by George Gaylord Simpson